The 1977 Taça de Portugal Final was the final match of the 1976–77 Taça de Portugal, the 37th season of the Taça de Portugal, the premier Portuguese football cup competition organized by the Portuguese Football Federation (FPF). The match was played on 18 May 1977 at the Estádio das Antas in Porto, and opposed two Primeira Liga sides: Braga and Porto. Porto defeated Braga 1–0 to claim the Taça de Portugal for a fourth time.

Match

Details

References

1977
Taca
FC Porto matches
S.C. Braga matches